Campese Ma'afu, (born 19 December 1984) is an Australian professional rugby union player. Ma'afu was selected to the Fiji national squad in 2010 and has gone on to win more than 50 caps.  Ma'afu has also played professionally for Cardiff Blues, Nottingham, Provence, Northampton Saints and Leicester Tigers.

Career

Family
Campese is the second oldest out 3 brothers, Salesi & Apakuki, born and raised in the Western suburbs of Sydney, he is of Tongan heritage through his father and Fijian heritage on his mother's side. His father and mother hail from the villages of Kolovai & Kadavu, respectively.

Elder brother Salesi played for the Wallabies at tight-head Prop while younger brother Campese played for Fiji at loose-head prop. A third brother, the youngest, 'Apakuki, plays for Tonga.

Club career
Ma'afu joined Cardiff Blues for the start of the Pro12 2012/13 season. He signed to play for Nottingham R.F.C. in the RFU Championship in the 2013/14 season. He remained at Nottingham until signing for the French Pro D2 club Provence in 2015.

In 2016, he signed for Aviva Premiership side, Northampton Saints with immediate effect from the 2016-17 season.

Ma'afu has since notched up 14 appearances for the Midlands side and most recently helped Saints' second the Northampton Wanderers reach the final of the Aviva 'A' League. Ma'afu and the side beat Gloucester United 36-15 to take the title.

It was announced on 5 June 2017 that Ma'afu would link up with fellow Saints Api Ratuniyarawa and head back to Fiji for the summer international.

After 2 seasons with Northampton, Ma'afu initially signed for Ealing Trailfinders before subsequently joining Leicester Tigers for the 2018/19 season. On 15 May 2019 he was announced as one of the players to leave Leicester following the end of the 2018-19 Premiership Rugby season.

References

External links
 

1984 births
Australian rugby union players
Fiji international rugby union players
Australian sportspeople of Tongan descent
Australian people of I-Taukei Fijian descent
Fijian people of Tongan descent
Rugby union players from Sydney
Fijian expatriate rugby union players
Expatriate rugby union players in Wales
Expatriate rugby union players in England
Fijian expatriate sportspeople in Wales
Australian expatriate sportspeople in Wales
Australian expatriate rugby union players
Living people
Cardiff Rugby players
Nottingham R.F.C. players
Northampton Saints players
Leicester Tigers players
I-Taukei Fijian people
Australian expatriate sportspeople in England
Fijian expatriate sportspeople in France
Australian expatriate sportspeople in France
Rugby union props